Gavin Lin (born 4 May 1980) is a Taiwanese film director. He attended Pittsburg State University.

Lin's debut feature film, In Case of Love, was released in 2010. The next year, he directed . A Moment of Love followed in 2013. In 2016, Lin directed , a film in the {{ill|Metro of Love|lt=Metro of Love|zh|台北愛情捷運系列電影}} series. In 2018, Lin directed More than Blue'', a remade South Korean film.

References

External links

1980 births
Living people
Taiwanese expatriates in the United States
Pittsburg State University alumni
Film directors from Kaohsiung